Tinicum Creek is a tributary of the Delaware River in Tinicum Township, Bucks County, Pennsylvania. Tinicum Creek and its two branches are part of the federally-designated Lower Delaware National Wild and Scenic River.

Historic crossings of Tinicum Creek include the Frankenfield Covered Bridge and an acqueduct of the Delaware Canal.

Statistics
Tinicum Creek was added to the Geographical Names Information System of the U.S. Geological Survey on 8 September 1979 as identification number 1209346. It is listed in the PA Gazetteer of Streams as identification number 03218.

Course
It, then, abruptly turns to the northwest at the point it receives another tributary from the southeast. Then the creek meanders generally to the northeast for approximately  until it meets its confluence with the Delaware. This results in an average slope of 21.875 feet per mile (3.93 meters per kilometer).

Geology
Appalachian Highlands Division
Piedmont Province
Gettysburg-Newark Lowland Section
Brunswick Formation
Diabase

The Brunswick Formation is a sedimentary layer of rock consisting of mudstone, siltstone, and beds of green, brown, and red-brown shale. Mineralogy consists of argillite and hornfels. About 200 million years ago, magma intruded into the Brunswick and cooled quickly forming a fine grained diabase consisting of primarily labradorite and augite.

Crossings and Bridges

See also
List of rivers of Pennsylvania
List of rivers of the United States
List of Delaware River tributaries

References

Rivers of Bucks County, Pennsylvania
Rivers of Pennsylvania
Tributaries of the Delaware River
Wild and Scenic Rivers of the United States